Benny Vexler (born 11 October 1962), also known as Benni Vexler, is an Israeli sailor who has competed in three Paralympics games winning a gold in 2004 Athenes in the three person keelboat the sonar.

References

External links
 
 

1962 births
Living people
Israeli male sailors (sport)
Israeli disabled sportspeople
World champions in sailing for Israel
Sonar class world champions
Disabled sailing world champions
Paralympic sailors of Israel
Paralympic gold medalists for Israel
Paralympic medalists in sailing
Sailors at the 2004 Summer Paralympics
Sailors at the 2008 Summer Paralympics
Sailors at the 2012 Summer Paralympics